State wildlife trails in the United States are state-sponsored systems of hiking and driving trails developed for the benefit of birdwatching and wildlife enthusiasts. They have been created and maintained by state governments or other state-level entities, both to promote ecology and to promote tourism. The term "trail" used in the names of most of these systems is, in general, a misnomer as that these trail networks are not single routes and are connected by motorways.

These wildlife trail systems typically cover multiple wildlife viewing sites covering large areas of their respective states. Viewing sites may include nature preserves, state parks, national parks, and other venues.

The first of these trail systems was the Great Texas Coastal Birding Trail. Numerous other trail systems have been opened throughout the country since.

Apart from these state-maintained trail networks, some nature-advocacy groups and other entities have defined their own "trails" (a notable example being the Audubon Society's Great River Birding Trail that spans the entire Mississippi River). These are not discussed here.

Trail systems by state
The following are state nature trails found in each state.

Alabama
Alabama has developed a total of 8 birding trails, with 280 locations as of 2019.  There are locations to watch birds in 65 of Alabama's 67 counties.

 Appalachian Highlands Birding Trail
 Alabama Coastal Birding Trail
 Black Belt Nature and Heritage Trail
 North Alabama Birding Trail
 Piedmont Plateau Birding Trail
 Piney Woods Birding Trail
 West Alabama Birding Trail
 Wiregrass Birding Trail

Alaska
 Alaska Coastal Wildlife Viewing Trail

Arizona
 Southeastern Arizona Birding Trail

California
 Central Coast Birding Trail
 Eastern Sierra Birding Trail

Colorado
 Great Pikes Peak Birding Trail
 Pawnee National Grassland Self-Guided Bird Tour
 Colorado Birding Trail

Connecticut
 Connecticut Coastal Birding Trail

Florida
 Great Florida Birding Trail

Georgia
 Georgia's Colonial Coast Birding Trail

Kansas
 Kansas Birding and Prairie Flora Trails

Louisiana
 Grand Isle Birding Trail

Kentucky
 John James Audubon Birding Trail

Minnesota
 Pine to Prairie Birding Trail
 Minnesota River Valley Birding Trail

Montana
 Great Montana Birding and Wildlife Trail

New Jersey
 New Jersey Birding & Wildlife Trails

New Mexico
 Southwest New Mexico Birding Trail

New York
 Audubon Niagara Birding Trails

North Dakota
 Steele Birding Drive 
 Bismarck-Mandan Birding Drive
 Central Dakota Birding Drive

Ohio
 Southern Ohio Birding and Heritage Trail

Oregon
 Klamath Basin Birding Trail
 Oregon Cascade Birding Trail

Pennsylvania
 Susquehanna River Birding and Wildlife Trail

Texas
 Great Texas Coastal Birding Trail
 Heart of Texas Wildlife Trail
 Panhandle Plains Wildlife Trail
 Prairies and Pineywoods Wildlife Trail

Utah
 Great Salt Lake Birding Trails

Vermont
 Lake Champlain Birding Trail

Virginia
 Virginia Birding and Wildlife Trail

Washington
 Great Washington Birding Trail

Wisconsin
 Great Wisconsin Birding Trail

See also
 Long-distance trails in the United States

Notes

Birdwatching sites in the United States
Protected areas of the United States